The Kansas Jayhawks football program is a college football team that represents the University of Kansas in the Big 12 Conference in the National Collegiate Athletic Association. The Jayhawks head coach is Lance Leipold. The team has had 40 head coaches since it started playing organized football in 1890 with the nickname Jayhawks. The team played its first season without an official head coach, however, Will Coleman, starting center on the inaugural team, served as the team's head coach. Edwin Mortimer Hopkins was the Jayhawks first official head coach. He served as the head coach only for the 1891 team finishing the season 7–0–1. Kansas joined the Missouri Valley Intercollegiate Athletic Association in 1907. After several changes, the conference eventually became the Big Eight Conference. The Jayhawks became a charter member of the Big 12 in 1996 when the Big Eight disbanded. Seven coaches have led Kansas to postseason bowl games: George Sauer, Jack Mitchell, Pepper Rodgers, Don Fambrough, Bud Moore, Glen Mason and Mark Mangino. Four coaches have won conference championships with the Jayhawks: A. R. Kennedy, Bill Hargiss, Sauer and Rodgers.

Mason is the all-time leader in games coached (102), and is tied with Mitchell for most years coached with nine. Kennedy is the all-time leader in total wins with 52. Fielding H. Yost has the highest winning percentage of any Jayhawk coach with a 10–0 record (1.000) his only year. Of coaches who served more than one season, Wylie G. Woodruff leads with a .833 winning percentage, barely edging out Kennedy's winning percentage of .831. David Beaty is, in terms of winning percentage, the worst coach the Jayhawks have had (.125). Of the 39 Kansas coaches, Yost is the only one that has been inducted into the College Football Hall of Fame as a coach. Mangino won several coach of the year accolades after the 2007 season, the only Jayhawks coach to do so.

Key

Coaches
Statistics correct as of the end of the 2022 season

Gallery of coaches

Notes

References
General

Specific

Lists of college football head coaches

Kansas sports-related lists